"Poppin' My Collar" is the second single from Most Known Unknown, an album by hip hop group Three 6 Mafia. The song peaked at #21 on the Billboard Hot 100, becoming their second Top 40 hit. The track achieved RIAA platinum certification status on September 6, 2005.

The song featured vocals on the chorus from Alabama rapper The Last Mr. Bigg and contains a sample of "Theme of the Mack" by Willie Hutch. 

The version in its music video is the remix featuring Project Pat. Kanye West makes a cameo appearance in the music video for the remix.

Other versions
 Poppin' My Collar (Instrumentals)
 Poppin' My Collar (Chopped and Screwed)
 Poppin' My Collar (Video Version)(featuring Project Pat)
 Poppin' My Collar (Cracktracks Remix)(featuring Project Pat, DMX)
 Poppin' My Collar (Swizz Beatz Remix)(featuring Project Pat, DMX, Swizz Beatz)
 Poppin' My Collar (Cracktrack Remix Instrumentals)
 Poppin' My Collar (The Last Mr. Bigg solo version)
 Poppin' My Collar (Remix) (featuring Project Pat, DMX, Lil Flip)
 Poppin' My Collar (Swizz Cracktracks Remix) (featuring Project Pat, DMX, Lil Flip, Swizz Beatz)
 Covered by the Mars Volta during "Cygnus....Vismund Cygnus" on 1/30/08 in Irvine, Ca.
 Poppin' My Collar (Swizz Cracktracks Remix)(featuring Project Pat & B.G.)

Charts

Weekly charts

Year-end charts

Certifications

References

2006 singles
Three 6 Mafia songs
Songs written by Juicy J
Songs written by DJ Paul
2005 songs
Gangsta rap songs
Sony BMG singles
Columbia Records singles
Songs written by Willie Hutch